27A is a 1974 Australian drama film directed by Esben Storm. At the AFI Awards it won in the Best Actor (Robert McDarra) and Best Fiction (Haydn Keenan) categories.

Plot
Bill McDonald is a middle aged alcoholic who is sentenced to six weeks in prison for a minor offence. He volunteers for psychiatric treatment and is committed to a hospital for the criminally insane supposedly only for the duration of his prison sentence. However under section 27A of Queensland's Mental Health Act he can be held there until hospital authorities declare him eligible for release.

Bill clashes with a nurse, Cornish, and is detained in the hospital because of his attitude. He attempts three times to escape. Eventually he is released after a journalist publicises his case.

Cast
Robert McDarra as Bill
Bill Hunter as Cornish
Graham Corry as Peter Newman
Richard Moir as Richard
James Kemp as Slats
Kris Olsen as Gloria
Brian Doyle as Lynch
Richard Creaser as Jeremy
Michael Norton as Mark
Haydn Keenan as Jeffrey
Gary McFeeter as Samuel
Tom Farley as Vic
Jim Doherty as suicide
Peter Gailey as co-escapee
Karl Florsheim as German patient
Race Gailey as office boy
Bob Maza as Darkie's mate
Zac Martin as Ernie
Kevin Healey as old acquaintance
Betty Dyson as alcoholic
Beth Brookes as singer
Brett Maxwell as young boy in warehouse
Pauline Fozall as pianist
Robert Ewing as public servant
Max Osbiston as Frederick Parsons

Production
Ebsen Storm and producer Haydn Keenan had made a number of successful short films and wanted to move into features. The script was developed by Storm in association with interviews he conducted in 1972 with Robert Somerville, a man who had been forcibly detained in a Queensland hospital in the late 1960s. By the time the film was made, however, section 27A had been repealed. Cecil Holmes worked as script editor. Storm:
The main influence on the style of the film was that we knew we wouldn't be able to raise a lot of money... If we wanted to make a feature film, we'd have to make it cheap. There was a style at that time, sort of pseudo-documentary, with a lot of hand-held camera work - Cullodden, Cathy Come Home and Poor Cow, that English, Ken Loach, Peter Watkins realism. I was drawn to the subject in the newspapers and then went off to investigate and research it. I felt that it would suit that style... A basic theme... is that of someone trying to break out, someone feeling trapped within themselves, trapped within the system. That probably drew me to it. Then when I went to research it, I found a broader tapestry.
Robert McDarra, who played the lead, was himself an alcoholic. Bill Hunter was cast in his first feature film role. $23,000 of the budget was raised from a syndicate of 18 businessmen, with $13,000 coming from a grant from the Australian Film Television Radio School.

The film was shot on 16mm starting 28 February 1973 at Christian Brothers psychiatric hospital near Sydney.

Release
The film premiered at the Sydney Film Festival and achieved a limited release. It never recovered its costs, however it screened at a number of festivals and was critically acclaimed.

The film won the AFI Award for Best Film. Robert McDarra won the AFI Award for his performance.

References

External links

27A at Australian Screen Online
27A at Smart Street Films website
27A at Oz Movies

1974 films
Australian drama films
1970s English-language films
Films directed by Esben Storm
1974 drama films
Films shot in 16 mm film